Bronenosets was a  built for the Imperial Russian Navy in the mid-1860s. The design was based on the American , but was modified to suit Russian engines, guns and construction techniques. The ship was only active when the Gulf of Finland was not frozen, but very little is known about her service. She was stricken in 1900 from the Navy List, converted into a coal barge in 1903 and renamed Barzha No. 324. The ship was lost in a storm sometime during World War I.

Description
She displaced  and her crew numbered eight officers and 88 enlisted men in 1865. They numbered 10 officers and 100 crewmen in 1877

The ship was fitted with a two-cylinder horizontal direct-acting steam engine built by Carr and MacPherson of Saint Petersburg. It drove a single propeller using steam that was provided by two rectangular boilers.

Bronenosets was designed to be armed with a pair of  smoothbore muzzle-loading guns purchased from Krupp of Germany and rifled in Russia, but the rifling project was seriously delayed and the ship was completed with nine-inch smoothbores. These lacked the penetration power necessary to deal with ironclads and they were replaced by license-built  smoothbore muzzle-loading Rodman guns in 1867–68. The Rodman guns were replaced around 1876 with the originally intended nine-inch rifled guns.

All of the wrought-iron armor that was used in the Uragan-class monitors was in  plates, just as in the Passaic-class ships. The gun turret was protected by eleven layers of armor and the pilothouse above it had eight layers of armor. Unlike their predecessors, the Uragans were built without deck armor to save weight, but Bronenosets had  plates added after completion.

Career
Construction of the ship began on 17 June 1863 at the Carr and MacPherson Shipyard in Saint Petersburg. Bronenosets was laid down on 24 December 1863 and she was launched on 24 March 1864. She entered service on 6 June 1865 and cost a total of 1,148,000 rubles, almost double her contract cost of 600,000 rubles. The ship was assigned to the Baltic Fleet upon completion and she, and all of her sister ships except , made a port visit to Stockholm, Sweden in July–August 1865 while under the command of General Admiral Grand Duke Konstantin Nikolayevich.

Later, an armored, outward-curving bulwark was fitted around the top of the turret to protect any crewmen there. Three sponsons were later added, probably during the 1870s, to the upper portion of the turret. Each sponson, one above the gun ports and one on each side of the turret, mounted a light gun, probably a  Engstrem gun, for defense against torpedo boats. A fourth gun was mounted on a platform aft of the funnel when a hurricane deck was built between the funnel and the turret, also probably during the 1870s.

Little is known about the ship's career other than that she was laid up each winter when the Gulf of Finland froze. Bronenosets was reclassified as a coast defense ironclad on 13 February 1892 and turned over to the Port of Kronstadt for disposal on 6 July 1900, although she was not stricken until 17 August. During 1903, the ship was converted into a coal barge by the removal of her turret, her side armor, and its wooden backing, and by the division of her hull into three holds. She was redesignated as Barzha No. 34, Barzha No. 51 and, in 1914, Barzha No. 324. The ship sank in a storm in the Gulf of Finland sometime during World War I.

Notes

Footnotes

References

Uragan-class monitors
1864 ships
Ships built at the Baltic Shipyard